Kaafir is a 2019 Indian web television series directed by Sonam Nair. Written by Bhavani Iyer, the series follows Kainaaz Akhtar, a woman from Pakistan occupied Kashmir who winds up on the Indian side of the Line-of-Control (LOC), and is held prisoner under the suspicion of being a militant. After giving birth to a child while spending seven years in imprisonment, Kainaaz and her daughter are helped by an Indian journalist, who seeks to bring them justice. It is inspired by the true story of Shehnaz Parveen. Starring Dia Mirza and Mohit Raina, all 8 episodes premiered on 15 June 2019 on the streaming platform ZEE5.

Cast
Dia Mirza as Kainaaz Akhtar
Mohit Raina as Vedant Rathod
Umar Sharif as Mohd. Siddiqi
Dara Sandhu as Rafique
Abhiroy Singh as Dhruv Rathod
Suhail Sidhwani as Veer Rathod
Dishita Jain as Seher
Meenal Kapoor as public prosecutor
Faezeh Jalali as Mastani

Episodes

Production
Kaafir is set in Jammu and Kashmir, and was shot almost entirely in Himachal Pradesh.

Reception 
The series received mixed to positive reviews.

References

External links

Kaafir on ZEE5

2019 Indian television series debuts
Indian Armed Forces in fiction
India–Pakistan relations in popular culture
Television shows set in Jammu and Kashmir
Kashmir conflict in fiction
ZEE5 original programming
Azad Kashmir
Himachal Pradesh